For people of the same name see Richard Smith (disambiguation)

Richard Smith (born 8 November 1987) is a Welsh rugby union player. A centre/wing, he plays club rugby for the Scarlets.

The centre signed for the Cardiff Blues in 2013 after graduating from playing for Cardiff RFC. Smith previously played for Neath in 2009/10 before spending a season in Australia where he turned out for Brisbane Bulldogs.

Richard's pace gained him a spot on the sevens circuit during the summer of 2011 where he played for Wales in three of the four legs of the FIRA series, playing in Bucharest, Barcelona and Moscow. He then played in every tournament of the 2012 HSBC world sevens series, scoring a total of 26 TRIES.

Smith made his debut for the Cardiff Blues at centre where he paired up with Jamie Roberts, for the teams' victory over Munster at Musgrave Park.

References

External links
 

Welsh rugby union players
Wales international rugby union players
Cardiff Rugby players
1987 births
Living people
Rugby union players from Neath
Rugby union centres